Adilbek Sabituly Niyazymbetov (born 19 May 1989) is an Uzbekistani-born amateur light-heavyweight boxer who competes for Kazakhstan. He won silver medals at the world championships in 2011 and 2013 and at the Summer Olympics in 2012 and 2016.

Career
At the 2011 World Amateur Boxing Championships he qualified for the Olympics by winning silver. He beat Jeysson Monroy, Meng Fanlong and Elshod Rasulov but lost the final to Cuban Julio César la Cruz.

At the 2012 Olympics he beat Carlos Góngora from Ecuador, Iranian Ehsan Rouzbahani 13–10, and Ukrainian Oleksandr Gvozdyk 13:13 on countback before losing the final to Russian favorite Egor Mekhontsev 15:15, again on countback.

At the 2016 Summer Olympics, he beat Mikhail Dauhaliavets, Teymur Mammadov and Joshua Buatsi before losing to Julio César La Cruz in the final.

References

External links 

 
 
 

1989 births
Living people
People from Nukus
Light-heavyweight boxers
Boxers at the 2012 Summer Olympics
Boxers at the 2016 Summer Olympics
Olympic boxers of Kazakhstan
Olympic silver medalists for Kazakhstan
Olympic medalists in boxing
Medalists at the 2012 Summer Olympics
Medalists at the 2016 Summer Olympics
Asian Games medalists in boxing
Boxers at the 2014 Asian Games
Kazakhstani male boxers
AIBA World Boxing Championships medalists
Asian Games gold medalists for Kazakhstan
Medalists at the 2014 Asian Games